Maciej Olenderek (born 16 October 1992) is a Polish professional volleyball player.

Career

Clubs
He debuted in PlusLiga in 2011. In 2015, he extended his contract with AZS Politechnika Warszawska for the next 2 years. After 6 seasons in the club from Warsaw, he moved to another Polish team – LOTOS Trefl Gdańsk.

Honours

Clubs
 CEV Challenge Cup
  2011/2012 – with AZS Politechnika Warszawska
 National championships
 2017/2018  Polish Cup, with Trefl Gdańsk

References

External links

 
 Player profile at PlusLiga.pl 
 Player profile at Volleybox.net

1992 births
Living people
People from Żyrardów
Sportspeople from Masovian Voivodeship
Polish men's volleyball players
Projekt Warsaw players
Trefl Gdańsk players
MKS Będzin players
Liberos